Blue Whale Systems Ltd is a privately held company located in Chiswick, London, England. The company provides push email software for mobile phones and devices using open standards as well as push mobile social networking software.

Their product, BlueWhaleMail, is a push email and push social networking application for mobile phones. POP3 and IMAP4 email accounts are supported as well as Yahoo, Gmail, AOL and Facebook

External links
Official website

Software companies of the United Kingdom
Companies based in the London Borough of Hounslow